E2E or e2e may refer to:

 BTB E2E, a class of Swiss electric locomotives
 End-to-end (disambiguation)
 End-to-end auditable voting systems
 Estradiol enantate, an estrogen medication
 Speedtwin E2E Comet 1, a British light aircraft